WISE J073444.02−715744.0 (designation abbreviated to WISE 0734−7157) is a brown dwarf of spectral class Y0, located in constellation Volans at approximately 35 light-years from Earth. It is one of the furthest Y0 brown dwarfs known.

Discovery
WISE 0734−7157 was discovered in 2012 by J. Davy Kirkpatrick et al. from data, collected by Wide-field Infrared Survey Explorer (WISE) Earth-orbiting satellite — NASA infrared-wavelength 40 cm (16 in) space telescope, which mission lasted from December 2009 to February 2011. In 2012 Kirkpatrick et al. published a paper in The Astrophysical Journal, where they presented discovery of seven new found by WISE brown dwarfs of spectral type Y, among which also was WISE 0734−7157.

Distance
Currently the most accurate distance estimate of WISE 0734−7157 is a trigonometric parallax, published in 2019 by Kirkpatrick et al.:  pc, or  ly.

See also	
The other six discoveries of brown dwarfs, published in Kirkpatrick et al. (2012):
	
WISE 0146+4234 (Y0)
WISE 0350−5658 (Y1)
WISE 0359−5401 (Y0)
WISE 0535−7500 (≥Y1)
WISE 0713−2917 (Y0)
WISE 2220−3628 (Y0)

References

Brown dwarfs
Y-type stars
Volans (constellation)
WISE objects